WAGC may refer to:

 WAGC-LD 14 (50.1), a defunct low-power television station formerly licensed to Atlanta, Georgia, United States
 WLMR 1450, which signed-on in 1946 as WAGC in Chattanooga, Tennessee
 WZTQ 1560, which signed-on in 1962 as WAGC in Centre, Alabama
 World Amateur Go Championship

See also
 WAGC-3, an Indian locomotive
 WAGC-385, the designation of the USS Biscayne